Island Pond is a village in the town of Brighton, Vermont, United States.

Island Pond may also refer to:

Island Pond (Cedarville, Massachusetts)
Island Pond (Plymouth, Massachusetts), in South Pond
Island Pond, also known as Great Island Pond, in The Pinehills, Plymouth, Massachusetts
Island Pond (Rockingham County, New Hampshire)
Island Pond (Stoddard, New Hampshire)
Island Pond (New York)

See also 
Island Creek Pond, in Duxbury, Massachusetts
Island Lake (disambiguation)